North Cumberland (also "Cumberland Northern") was a parliamentary constituency in Cumberland which returned one Member of Parliament (MP) to the House of Commons of the Parliament of the United Kingdom, elected by the first past the post system of election.

The constituency was created for the 1918 general election, and abolished for the 1950 general election.

Boundaries
The Urban Districts of Holme Cultram and Wigton, the Rural Districts of Brampton, Carlisle, and Longtown, and part of the Rural District of Wigton.  (Carlisle, Brampton and Longtown rural districts merged in 1930 into the Border Rural District)

Members of Parliament

Election results

Election in the 1910s

Election in the 1920s

Elections in the 1930s

General Election 1939–40:

Another General Election was required to take place before the end of 1940. The political parties had been making preparations for an election to take place from 1939 and by the end of this year, the following candidates had been selected; 
Liberal: Wilfrid Roberts
Conservative:

Election in the 1940s

References

Politics of Cumbria
Parliamentary constituencies in North West England (historic)
Constituencies of the Parliament of the United Kingdom established in 1918
Constituencies of the Parliament of the United Kingdom disestablished in 1950